Project Wildfire was a nationwide, multi-agency investigation of various transnational criminal gangs in 2015 that resulted in the arrests of 976 individuals, representing 239 different organizations, in 282 cities in the United States mainland and Puerto Rico. Eighty-two firearms, 5.2 kilograms of methamphetamine, 7.8 kilograms of marijuana, 5.6 kilograms of cocaine, 1.5 kilograms of heroin, US$379,399, counterfeit merchandise with a suggested retail price of US$547,534 and five vehicles were also seized.

As part of the ongoing U.S. Immigration and Customs Enforcement (ICE) effort known as Operation Community Shield, Project Wildfire began on February 23, 2015, and concluded on March 31, with most arrests involving members and those affiliated with the Crips, Bloods, and Sureños along with a few Puerto Rican gangs and several prison-based gangs. Arrests were made all around the country, with the greatest activity taking place in Texas, Detroit, Los Angeles County, Florida and San Juan, Puerto Rico.

Arrests
The following number of arrests, made by Homeland Security Investigations (HSI) and other participating agencies, were released by ICE:

 In Lubbock, Texas, HSI special agents and task force officers arrested 122 known or suspected gang members and associates from the Bloods, Crips, Rolling 60s, Mexican Mafia, Sureños, West Texas, Raza Unida, Aryan Brotherhood, White Aryan Resistance, West Side, Gangster Disciples, Peckerwood, Texas Syndicate and West Texas Tango.
 In the Detroit area, (HSI) special agents and task force officers arrested 89 gang members and associates with ties to gangs such as the Latin Counts, Folk Nation, Sureños and Atherton Terrace.
 In Puerto Rico and central Florida, 46 members of the Zorrilla criminal organization were arrested for various charges of manufacturing and distributing narcotics, money laundering and other related criminal activity.
 In the Chicago area, HSI special agents arrested 30 gang members and affiliates with ties to the Sureños 13, Latin Kings, La Raza, Conservative Vice Lords, Gangster Disciples, 4 Corner Hustlers, Maniac Latin Disciples and the Vice Lords.
 In California’s Imperial Valley, HSI special agents arrested 28 individuals, including 10 documented gang members of the Brole, North Side Centro, West Side Centro, South Side Centro and Pilgrim street gangs.

See also
 Illegal immigration to the United States
 Mexican Drug War

References

Aryan Brotherhood
Bloods
Crips
February 2015 events in the United States
Folk Nation
March 2015 events in the United States
Battles of the Mexican drug war
Mexican Mafia
Operations against organized crime in the United States
Sureños